One Off's Remixes and B Sides is the third album by Quantic.

Track list

References
http://www.discogs.com/Quantic-One-Offs-Remixes-And-B-Sides/release/1040676

2006 albums
Will Holland albums